Maximilian Großer (born 23 July 2001) is a German footballer who plays as a defensive midfielder for Hamburger SV II.

Career
Großer made his professional debut for Dynamo Dresden in the 2. Bundesliga on 28 June 2020, coming on as a substitute in the 90th minute for Linus Wahlqvist in the home match against VfL Osnabrück, which finished as a 2–2 draw.

References

External links

 
 
 

2001 births
Living people
German footballers
Association football midfielders
Dynamo Dresden players
Hamburger SV II players
2. Bundesliga players
3. Liga players